Planinica or Planinitsa, which translates to mountaineer in English, (Cyrillic: Планиница) may refer to the following places:

Serbia
 Planinica (Pirot)
 Planinica (Zaječar)
 Planinica (Mionica)
 Planinica (Dimitrovgrad)
 Planinica (Trstenik)

Bosnia and Herzegovina
 Planinica (Bugojno)

Bulgaria
 Planinitsa, Burgas Province
 Planinitsa, Pernik Province